Jeffrey is a common English given name, and a variant form of the name Geoffrey (itself from a Middle French variant of Godfrey, Gottfried).

It has been argued that the common derivation of Middle French Geoffrey (or Geoffroy), Jeffery from Godfrey is mistaken, and that the names reflect two separate first Germanic elements god vs. gaut, which became conflated in Old High German by the end of the early medieval period.

Outside of North America, Geoffrey is more common than Jeffrey. Jeffrey and its variants are found as surnames, usually as a patronymic ending in -s (e.g., Jefferies, Jaffrays); The surname Jefferson is also a patronymic version of the given name. In Scotland, Jeffrey is most frequently found to be a surname.

Variations include Jeff, Jeffry, Jeffy, Jeffery, Jeffory, Geoff, Geoffrey, Jeffeory, Geffrey,  Jefferson, and Jeffro.

People with the name Jeffrey

Academia
 Jeffrey Cole, American anthropologist
 Jeffrey Garten, American businessman and writer, professor and dean of Yale School of Management
 Jeffrey Hackney, British legal academic at Wadham College, Oxford
 Jeffrey A. Hoffman, American astronaut, professor of aeronautics and astronautics at Massachusetts Institute of Technology
 Jeffrey Kaplan (academic), American academic, author and book editor
 Jeffrey Lagarias, American professor of mathematics at the University of Michigan
 Jeffrey Rosen, American legal academic and commentator, professor of law at George Washington University Law School
 Jeffrey Sachs, American professor of economics and director of the Earth Institute at Columbia University, New York

Art
 Jeffrey Rowbotham, Scottish architect 
 Jeffrey Schiff, American artist 
 Jeffrey Steele (artist), British abstract artist

Business
 Jeffrey Cheah, founder of Malaysian conglomerate Sunway Group
 Jeffrey Hollender, American entrepreneur, author and activist, co-founder and former CEO of Seventh Generation Inc.
 Jeffrey Katzenberg, American co-founder of DreamWorks SKG and CEO of DreamWorks Animation SKG
Jeffrey Rosen, American billionaire businessman
 Jeffrey Steinberger, American trial lawyer and founder of law firm, judge pro tem, adjunct law professor, TV legal analyst

Crime
 Jeffrey Dahmer, American cannibalistic serial killer and sex offender
 Jeffrey Dampier, American lottery winner who was murdered
 Jeffrey "Jeff" Doucet, American pedophile murdered by Gary Plauché
 Jeffrey Epstein, American financier and convicted sex offender
 Jeffrey Russell Hall, American political extremist killed by his son
 Jeffrey R. MacDonald, American former physician convicted of killing his family

Entertainment
 Jeffrey Anderson-Gunter, Jamaican film and television actor
 Jeffrey Ching, British contemporary classical composer
 Jeffrey Combs, American character actor best known for his horror film roles
 Jeffrey Daniel, American singer and dancer with the soul group Shalamar
 Jeffrey DeMunn, American actor
 Jeffrey Donovan, American actor
 Jeffrey Goldblum, American film and television actor 
 Jeffrey Hunter, American film and television actor
 Jeffrey Jones, American actor
 Jeffrey Isbell (Izzy Stradlin), American musician
 Jeffrey Katzenberg, American film producer
 Jeffrey Lau (born 1955), Hong Kong film director, screenwriter, actor and producer
 Jeffrey Lewis, American musician and comic artist
 Jeffrey Lyons, American television and film critic
 Jeffrey Marsh, American writer, activist actor, artist and author
 Jeffrey Dean Morgan, American actor
 Jeffrey Nordling, American actor
 Jeffrey Osborne, American singer–songwriter, musician and lyricist
 Jeffrey Reiner,American film director, editor, screenwriter, television director, and producer
 Jeffrey D. Sams, American actor
 Jeffrey Shih, American video game player
 Jeffrey Steele, American singer and songwriter
 Jeffrey Tambor, American actor
 Jeffrey Toobin, American commentator and writer
 Jeffrey Wright (actor), American film and television actor

Literature
 Jeffrey Archer, English author and former politician
 Jeffrey Brown (comics), American comic book writer and artist 
 Jeffrey Carver, American science fiction author
 Jeffrey Daniels (author), Chicago-raised African American poet, artist, and professor
 Jeffrey Eugenides, American novelist and short story writer of Greek and Irish origins
 Jeffrey Ford, American novelist and story writer
 Jeffrey Moussaieff Masson, Sanskrit specialist and author who trained as a psychoanalyst in Toronto
 Jeffrey Rowland, American webcomic artist
 Jeffrey Simpson, American-born Canadian journalist and national affairs columnist with The Globe and Mail newspaper
 Jeffrey S. Williams, American writer and Civil War historian

Military
 Jeffrey Chessani, former lieutenant colonel in the U.S. Marine Corps
 Jeffrey Feinstein, former lieutenant colonel in the U.S. Air Force
 Jeffrey J. Schloesser, former major general in the U.S. Army
 Jeffrey Williams (astronaut), former U.S. Army officer and astronaut

Sport
 Jeffrey Buttle, Canadian figure skater
 Jeffrey Carlson, American hockey player, one of the fictional Hanson Brothers from the film, "Slap Shot"
 Jeffrey Earnhardt, American racing driver
 Jeffrey Finley, Canadian football player
 Jeffrey Gunter (born 1999), American football player
 Jeffrey Jordan, son of Michael Jordan, US former college basketball player
 Jeffrey Lay, Canadian rower

Other

 Jeffrey Brenner, American CEO of the Jewish Board of Family and Children's Services

Fictional characters
 Jeffrey P. Brookes III, on the TV sitcom The Ropers
Jeffrey Cross, aka OG Loc, from Grand Theft Auto: San Andreas
 Jeffrey Dexter "Jeff" Boomhauer III, one of the main characters on the animated Fox Network TV series King of the Hill, voiced by Mike Judge
 Jeffrey Goines, one of the main characters in the 1995 science fiction film 12 Monkeys, played by Brad Pitt
 Jeffrey Matthews a.k.a. Moondoggie, in the film Gidget, the two sequels Gidget Goes Hawaiian and Gidget Goes to Rome, played by James Darren
 Jeffrey Michener, in the TV series The Last Ship, played by Mark Moses
 Jeffrey Sinclair, one of the main characters in the 1990s science fiction TV series Babylon 5, played by Michael O'Hare
 Jeffrey Hoytsman, a defense attorney and drug addict in the TV show Brooklyn 99

See also
Geoffrey
Jeff
Jefferson (given name)
Jeffery

References

English masculine given names
English-language surnames
Masculine given names
Lists of people by given name